Keshav Sthapit is a former mayor of Kathmandu metropolitan city. He also held the position of minister in Bagmati Pradesh and is a former member of the province's Assembly.
Keshav Sthapit was elected as the mayor of Kathmandu in 1997. After the royal takeover in 2005, he was appointed the Mayor of Kathmandu by the Monarch. In year 2005 he was top finalist for world best mayor. After the return of democracy, he was appointed as a Commissioner of Kathmandu Valley Development Authority after joining Unified Communist Party of Nepal (Maoist) but was removed from the post after only nine months. He was a candidate for Member of Parliament from Kathmandu 6 in 2017, but came in fifth place under the ticket of Federal Socialist Party. He returned to CPN-UML and became a Provincial Minister but was sacked by Chief Minister Dormani Poudel after misbehaving during cabinet meetings. There have been multiple allegations of sexual assault against Sthapit.

Electoral history

2013 Constituent Assembly election

See also 
 Nepali Congress

References

Nepalese politicians
Mayors of Kathmandu
Living people
Provincial cabinet ministers of Nepal
Members of the Provincial Assembly of Bagmati Province
1956 births